The Repeating Rifle Model 1886 commonly known as Mannlicher Model 1886 was a late 19th-century Austrian straight-pull bolt-action rifle, adopted in 1886. It used a wedge-lock straight pull action bolt. It was the first straight-pull bolt-action service rifle of any nation.

History

The M1886 itself was an improvement of the Mannlicher Model 1885 Trials Rifle that was a prototype, meant to replace the by then obsolete M1867 Werndl-Holub drum-breech single-shot rifle. It was the first of the Austro-Hungarian service rifles to introduce the feature of the clip dropping out of the bottom of the magazine when the last round is chambered.

Conversions 
Between 1888–1892 95% of the M1886 rifles were converted (rebarreled) to 8×52mmR Mannlicher under the designation M1886-88. Rifles in original (11mm) caliber with Austrian acceptance marks are a rare find.

Service history 
The rifle was quickly made obsolete by the introduction of the Lebel Model 1886 rifle with its new smokeless cartridge. As such it was quickly replaced in Austrian service by its successor the M1888. The rifle still had a long life, however, and turned up in Spain in the hands of republican troops during the Spanish Civil War in the hands of members of the British Battalion at Madrigueras where they were used for training before being replaced on the eve of the Battle of Jarama by more modern rifles such as the Mosin-Nagant.

Controversies 
According to an unconfirmed theory Ferdinand Mannlicher could adapt in his rifle some construction details from Orville Robinson's straight-pull magazine rifle with a hinging wedge breechblock. In 1876 Mannlicher visited the Centennial Exposition to study firearms design, and he researched plans and models at the patent office in Philadelphia. He may have been exposed there to Orvill Robinson's project which was patented in the US (but not in Europe) (and produced, until his company was bought and shut down by W.R.A.). However, it is unknown if Mannlicher has even seen any Robinson's project

Users
 
 
 
 
 :Surplus rifles were bought from German dealers, they were still in use in the 1930s
  Spain

See also
 Mannlicher M1888
 Mannlicher M1890 Carbine
 Mannlicher M1895

References 

Straight-pull rifles
Rifles of Austria
World War I Austro-Hungarian infantry weapons
8 mm firearms
Mannlicher rifles
Firearms by Ferdinand Mannlicher
Weapons and ammunition introduced in 1886